A kulāf, or kolāh, is a type of cap that designated Sasanian nobility and official. It appears on numerous reliefs and seals of the Sasanian Empire period.

The kulāf is often decorated with pearls, on the edge and on the surface of the cap. It may also be shown with an emblem or tamgha on the surface.

References

Sasanian Empire
Iranian clothing